The North Carolina State Colored Industrial Fair also referred to as the  North Carolina Colored Fair, was first held in Raleigh, North Carolina in 1879 and continued to be held for about 50 years until 1930. A historical marker commemorated the fairs was erected in 2018.

Charles N. Hunter is credited as one of the creators of the fair to highlight the progress of African Americans since emancipation.  Frankie E. Harris Wassom exhibited her art at the fair in 1886 and wrote a song about the fair. The fair was held in 1914.

A colored fair was also held in Winston-Salem.

References

Fairs in the United States